This is a chronology of major films produced in South Africa or by the South African film industry. There may be an overlap, particularly between South African and foreign films which are sometimes co-produced; the list should attempt to document films which are either South African produced or strongly associated with South African culture. Please see the detailed A-Z of films currently covered on Wikipedia at :Category:South African films.

1910s–1940s

1950s

1960s

1970s

1980s

1990s

2000s

2010s

2020s

See also
 List of Afrikaans-language films

https://www.imdb.com/title/tt4957430/?ref_=nm_knf_t_1==References==

Sources

External links

 South African film at the Internet Movie Database

Lists of South African films